Pempeliella enderleini is a species of snout moth. It is found on the Balearic Islands.

References

Moths described in 1934
Phycitini
Endemic fauna of the Balearic Islands